Chiang Dao is a tambon (subdistrict) of Chiang Dao District, in Chiang Mai Province, Thailand. In 2020 it had a total population of 16,746 people.

Administration

Central administration
The tambon is subdivided into 16 administrative villages (muban).

Local administration
The area of the subdistrict is shared by 2 local governments.
the subdistrict municipality (Thesaban Tambon) Chiang Dao (เทศบาลตำบลเชียงดาว)
the subdistrict administrative organization (SAO) Chiang Dao (องค์การบริหารส่วนตำบลเชียงดาว)

References

External links
Thaitambon.com on Chiang Dao

Tambon of Chiang Mai province
Populated places in Chiang Mai province